Cerynia is a genus of flatid planthoppers found mainly in Southeast Asian subtropical and tropical forests, with records from China, Vietnam, Borneo and the Philippines (almost certainly incomplete); it is typical of the tribe Ceryniini.

Species
This genus includes:
 Cerynia albata  - type species (as "Flata albata Stål, 1854 from Malaya")
 Cerynia bilineata 
 Cerynia digitula 
 Cerynia fulgida 
 Cerynia lineola 
 Cerynia maria  [=Cerynia nigropustulata ]
 Cerynia mixana 
 Cerynia monacha 
 Cerynia parnassioides 
 Cerynia trilineata

References 

Flatidae
Hemiptera genera
Taxa named by Carl Stål